Hashem Ahmadzadeh is an Iranian and Kurdish scholar, who is a lecturer in the Kurdish Studies Centre of the University of Exeter.

Biography 

Ahmadzadeh was born in eastern Kurdistan in 1961. He got his Bachelor degree in English from Zahedan University in 1985. Afterwards he left Iran and settled in Sweden, where he received his Bachelor degree in political sciences in Uppsala University. In 1996 he got his Master's degree in the same department and in 2003 he finished his PhD. he has been living in England since 2005. He is married and has two children.

Career 
Ahmadzadeh teaches at the Institute of Arabic and Islamic Studies (IAIS). Furthermore, he is one of the founding members of the new MA in Kurdish studies which was established in 2006 in the University of Exeter, as well as supervising doctoral students of Kurdish studies. 

His doctoral thesis, Nation and Novel: A Study of Kurdish and Persian Narratives Discourse, was translated into Turkish in 2004 by Azad Zana Gundogan  It was also translated into Persian by Bakhtiar Sajjadi in 2007. 
His other works include a translation of Dr. Abbas Vali's Genealogies of the Kurds: Constructions of Nation and National Identity in Kurdish Historical Writing ,The Kurds and their Others: Fragmented Identity and Fragmented Politics into Kurdish as well as Paul Auster's  The Red Notebook. Ahmadzadeh has contributed to  referred international journals with his essays on modern Kurdish novel and literary criticism.

References
http://www.huss.ex.ac.uk/iais/staff/ahmadzadeh/index.php, also includes a complete list of his works.
https://web.archive.org/web/20071225101150/http://www.huss.ex.ac.uk/iais/research/kurdish.htm,  also includes the home page of MA in Kurdish Studies.

Notes

External links
Chatham House's new paper,The Kurdish Policy Imperative, Gareth Stansfield, Robert Lowe and Hashem Ahmadzadeh, December 2007
Dr. Ahmadzadeh's teaching modules in Kurdish Studies
world conference of Kurdish studies
Dr. ahmadzadeh's articles in International Academic Journals 
Kurdish Aspect's interview with Dr. Ahmadzadeh
Kurdish Globe's interview with Dr. Ahmadzadeh

1961 births
Living people
Kurdish writers
Iranian Kurdish people
Academics of the University of Exeter
Kurdish scholars
Kurdish social scientists
Kurdish sociologists